The 1992–93 NBA season was the Mavericks' thirteenth season in the National Basketball Association. In the 1992 NBA draft, the Mavericks selected Jim Jackson out of Ohio State University with the fourth overall pick. However, Jackson held out most of his rookie season due to a contract dispute, and refused to play for the Mavericks. The dismantling of the 1980s Mavericks continued as Fat Lever missed the entire season with a knee injury. After a 1–3 start to the season, the Mavericks went on a 12-game losing streak between November and December, posted a 15-game losing streak between December and January, lost eight consecutive games between January and February, and then suffered a dreadful 19-game losing streak between February and March which left them with the worst record in NBA history as they stood 4–57 through 61 games. Head coach Richie Adubato was fired after a 2–27 start, and was replaced with assistant Gar Heard. The team held a 4–45 record at the All-Star break during their 19-game losing streak.

However, Jackson finally signed with the Mavericks in early March, and played in the final 28 games of the season, averaging 16.3 points, 4.7 assists and 1.4 steals per game, although he was not selected to an NBA All-Rookie Team at season's end. In the final 21 games, Jackson helped the team to seven wins, including two straight to close out the year, but the Mavericks still finished with a franchise worst 11–71 (.134) record. Derek Harper led the team with 18.2 points and 5.4 assists per game, while second round draft pick Sean Rooks averaged 13.5 points and 7.4 rebounds per game, and Terry Davis provided the team with 12.7 points and 9.3 rebounds per game. In addition, second-year forward Doug Smith provided with 10.4 points and 5.4 rebounds per game, while Randy White averaged 9.7 points and 5.8 rebounds per game, second-year guard Mike Iuzzolino contributed 8.7 points and 4.7 assists per game, and rookie guard Walter Bond contributed 8.0 points per game.

The 1992–93 Mavericks also had by far the worst average point differential in the history of the NBA at -15.2 points per game – over three points worse than the 1972–73 76ers who won only nine games, and over five points worse than the 2015–16 76ers who won ten. For this reason, NBA historian Kyle Wright declared in 2007 that the 1992–93 Mavericks must rank as, at least relative to their opponents, the worst team in the history of the NBA. Following the season, Heard was fired as head coach, and Iuzzolino signed as a free agent with the Orlando Magic, but was later on released to free agency.

For the season, the Mavericks changed the wordmark of the city and team name on their primary logo, slightly redesigned their home uniforms, and sported new blue road uniforms. The redesigned logo and uniforms both remained in use until 2001.

Draft picks

Roster

Roster Notes
 Shooting guard Fat Lever missed the entire season due to a knee injury.

Regular season

Season standings

y - clinched division title
x - clinched playoff spot

z - clinched division title
y - clinched division title
x - clinched playoff spot

Record vs. opponents

Game log

|- style="background:#fbb;"
| 1
| November 7
| Utah
| L 106–122
| Derek Harper (26)
| Mike Iuzzolino (6)
| Derek Harper (9)
| Reunion Arena12,514
| 0–1
|- style="background:#fbb;"
| 2
| November 10
| @ Minnesota
| L 104–118
| Walter Bond (25)
| Smith, Moore, & Hodge (6)
| Mike Iuzzolino (6)
| Target Center18,202
| 0–2
|- style="background:#fbb;"
| 3
| November 11
| Milwaukee
| L 116–124
| Derek Harper (21)
| Terry Davis (11)
| Mike Iuzzolino (5)
| Reunion Arena11,276
| 0–3
|- style="background:#bfb;"
| 4
| November 14
| Atlanta
| W 113–105
| Terry Davis (35)
| Terry Davis (17)
| Derek Harper (7)
| Reunion Arena13,488
| 1–3

Player statistics

NOTE: Please write the player statistics in alphabetical order by last name.

Awards and records

Transactions

References

See also
 1992-93 NBA season

Dallas Mavericks seasons
Dallas
Dallas
Dallas